Tibet Autonomous Region, an autonomous region of the People's Republic of China, has three administrative divisional levels – prefectural, county, and township – as enumerated in the infobox on the right.

Administrative divisions
All of these administrative divisions are explained in greater detail at Administrative divisions of the People's Republic of China. This chart lists only prefecture-level and county-level divisions of Tibet Autonomous Region.

Administrative divisions history

Recent changes in administrative divisions

Population composition

Prefectures

Counties

See also
List of township-level divisions of the Tibet Autonomous Region

References

Citations

Sources 

 THDL.org: Gazetteer of Tibet & the Himalayas

 
Tibet Autonomous Region
Administrative divisions